Eudesmeola is a monotypic moth genus of the family Erebidae erected by George Hampson in 1926. Its only species, Eudesmeola lawsoni, or Lawson's night moth, was first described by Felder and Rogenhofer in 1874. It is found in the dry inland areas of Australia.

The wingspan is about 70 mm. Adults have brown wings with a complex pattern of light and dark lines and markings. The underside of the wings is pale brown, with a broad dark brown submarginal band, and a dark spot in the centre of the wing.

The larvae feed on Geijera parviflora.

References

Calpinae
Monotypic moth genera